Maik Franz (born 5 August 1981) is a German former footballer.

Career 
Franz was born in Merseburg, East Germany, and grew up in Langenstein near Halberstadt, where he began his football career, and joined 1. FC Magdeburg's youth division in the summer of 1998. As part of the A-Youth team, Franz won the DFB-Youth-Cup in 1999.

Franz played defence for 1. FC Magdeburg until 2001, when he transferred to VfL Wolfsburg, where he played the same position in the Bundesliga. In Wolfsburg, Franz distinguished himself through his strong tackling, winning 63 percent of his challenges, making him the club's best player in this respect. He played 91 Bundesliga-matches during his time in Wolfsburg, scoring twice.

In July 2006, Franz transferred to the 2. Bundesliga, joining Karlsruher SC. Together with Mario Eggimann, he formed the central defence of Karlsruhe's starting eleven, and with his Bundesliga experience, he played a crucial role in the club's promotion to the top flight. After a strong start in the 2008–09 season, both for Franz and his club, he extended his contract until 2011. After Eggimann transferred to Hannover 96 in the summer of 2008, Franz took over the captain's armband at Karlsruher SC.

Having sustained a serious injury to his right foot in October 2008, Franz had to undergo surgery in January of the following year, and was unable to play for three months. In April 2009, he celebrated his comeback in a home match against 1899 Hoffenheim.

After the KSC was relegated at the end of the 2008–09 season, Franz signed a contract with Eintracht Frankfurt, valid only for the Bundesliga. When Eintracht Frankfurt were also relegated to years later, Franz and the club were unable to agree on a contract that was also valid for the 2nd division.

On 24 June 2011, Hertha BSC announced they had signed Franz on a three-year deal, but due to frequent injury, made only seven appearances in his first season in Berlin.

On 6 February 2014 Franz was displaced to Hertha BSC II.

Attributes 
In the 2007–08 season, Franz was openly criticised for his play style, distinguished by hard challenges and continuous provocation of opposing players. The criticism reached its height in February 2008, following the match between VfB Stuttgart, and Karlsruher SC. Stuttgart-star Mario Gómez grossly insulted Franz for his player style. He later retracted his words, but maintained his criticism of Franz. As a result, both the criticism and support for Franz (KSC fans nicknamed him "Iron Maik") intensified. Following the release of an official report on the incident, the discussion faded out over the following weeks. In April 2011, Werder Bremen captain Torsten Frings and manager Thomas Schaaf criticised Franz for having elbowed Denni Avdić in the face during an aerial challenge.

Due to his playing style, Franz is frequently booked. In the 2009–10 season, he donated 500 Euro to charity for each of his eleven yellow cards. In 2010–11, Franz was booked thirteen times in twenty-three matches.

International career 
On 12 February 2002, Franz made his debut for the German U-21 national team against Northern Ireland. He was part of the German squad for the 2004 U21 European Championship, making his only appearance in against Sweden.

References

External links 
  
 
 

1981 births
Living people
People from Merseburg
German footballers
Germany under-21 international footballers
Germany B international footballers
Association football midfielders
Bundesliga players
2. Bundesliga players
VfB Germania Halberstadt players
1. FC Magdeburg players
VfL Wolfsburg players
Karlsruher SC players
Eintracht Frankfurt players
Hertha BSC players
Hertha BSC II players
Footballers from Saxony-Anhalt